The Drop may refer to:

Arts, entertainment, and media

Literature
The Drop (Connelly novel), a 2011 novel by Michael Connelly
The Drop (Lehane novel), a 2014 novel by Dennis Lehane

Music

Albums
The Drop (album), a 1997 album by Brian Eno
The Drop, a 1997 album by Geoffrey Williams

Songs
"The Drop", a 1957 song by Ray Conniff from Dance the Bop!
"The Drop", a 1996 instrumental by Evan Parker from London Air Lift
"The Drop", a 1997 song by Geoffrey Williams from the album
"The Drop", a 2002 song by Peter Gabriel from the album Up
"The Drop" (Regurgitator song), a 2004 single by Regurgitator
"The Drop", a 2004 instrumental by Harry Gregson-Williams from the soundtrack for Man on Fire
"The Drop", a 2006 song by Sucioperro from Random Acts of Intimacy
"The Drop", a 2012 song by Oh No from Dr. No's Tornado Funk
"The Drop" (Lethal Bizzle song), a 2014 song by Lethal Bizzle
“The Drop”, a 2017 song and extended play by Gammer

Other arts, entertainment, and media
The Drop (2014 film), a film, based on the Lehane novel
The Drop (2022 film), American black comedy film
The Drop (sculpture), a 2009 sculpture in Vancouver
The Drop, an urban contemporary subchannel operated by KUVO
The Drop, a BBC Three fashion streetwear competition show

Other uses
The Drop Hydro, a power station in Australia

See also
Drop (disambiguation)